Paravaejovis is a genus of scorpions in the family Vaejovidae. There are about 11 described species in the genus Paravaejovis.

Species
These 11 species belong to the genus Paravaejovis:
 Paravaejovis confusus (Stahnke, 1940)
 Paravaejovis diazi (Williams, 1970)
 Paravaejovis eusthenura (Wood, 1863)
 Paravaejovis galbus (Williams, 1970)
 Paravaejovis gravicaudus (Williams, 1970)
 Paravaejovis hoffmanni (Williams, 1970)
 Paravaejovis pumilis (Williams, 1970)
 Paravaejovis puritanus (Gertsch, 1958)
 Paravaejovis schwenkmeyeri (Williams, 1970)
 Paravaejovis spinigerus (Wood, 1863) (Arizona stripetail scorpion)
 Paravaejovis waeringi (Williams, 1970)

References

Further reading

 

Vaejovidae